Christakis Zografos (1820 – 19 August 1898) was an Ottoman Greek banker, benefactor and one of the distinguished personalities of the Greek community of Constantinople (modern Istanbul).

Early life and career
Zografos was born in the village of Qestorat in southern Albania, when the region was under Ottoman rule. He attended the Zosimaia School in Ioannina and then went to Constantinople to join his father's business there. He was initially a co-partner in a small money changing stand at Galata. During 1854–1881, Zografos became one of the major creditors of the Ottoman state. He also became one of its leading bankers and financiers and president of the Ottoman capital's trolley company. He was awarded by three sultans, sat on the Imperial Board of Estimate and served as president of the Ecumenical Patriarchate's Clerico-Lay Advisory Board. Because of his high social status he was widely known as Christakis Efendi (Lord Christakis).

Following the Fire of Pera in 1870, Zoğrafos purchased the damaged Naum Theatre and had it rebuilt as what is now the Çiçek Pasajı.

Zografos was known as Sultan Murad V's personal jeweller. After the successful coup against Sultan Abdülaziz, he was entrusted with the sultan's jewellery collection as it was assumed it would not fetch its true value in Constantinople. Zografos was sent to France to try and sell it and never returned to the city. [10]

Philanthropy
Zografos lavishly endowed educational and other facilities for the Greek communities living in regions that belonged, at that time, to the Ottoman Empire.

He offered large sums of money for the establishment of two middle schools in Constantinople: one in Beyoğlu (Pera), the other a school for girls in Yeniköy on the Bosphorus. Both were called Zographeion Lyceum in his memory. He also sponsored the rebuilding of a Greek library in the city and gave 1,000-franc endowments to the universities of Munich and Paris for awards in the fields of Greek literature and history.

In his birthplace he founded another Zographeion College where the male and female graduates became Greek language teachers. Zografos also offered annual scholarships to 60 students (30 females and 30 males) from poor families to cover their living costs while they studied.

Other grants went to the Patriarchate's Halki seminary on Heybeliada (Halki). In recognition he was awarded the Gold Cross of the Ecumenical Patriarch Joachim II.

His son Georgios Christakis-Zografos became a notable diplomat, politician and head of the Autonomous Republic of Northern Epirus (1914).

Legacy

Under the Communist regime in Albania (1945–1992), Zografos and his son were labelled 'enemies of the state'. Anyone from his home town who held the name Zografos, whether they were related or not, was also persecuted. After 1992, however, the situation changed and today the Zographeion school in Qestorati has been renovated and reopened as a museum.

See also
Zographeion Lyceum
Zographeion College
Çiçek Pasajı
Ottoman Greeks

References
10. Yilmaz Öztuna. Bir darbenin anatomisi. 1982, p111

Sources
 

1820 births
1896 deaths
People from Gjirokastër
Greek bankers
Greek philanthropists
Greeks from the Ottoman Empire
Zosimaia School alumni
19th-century philanthropists